Burgruine Hieburg is a castle in the state of Salzburg, Austria.

See also
List of castles in Austria

References
This article was initially translated from the German Wikipedia.

Castles in Salzburg (state)